Lathmar Holi (Holi of sticks) is a Hindu festival celebrated in the twin towns of Barsana and Nandgaon, also known as the towns of Radha and Krishna respectively. Every year, during the period of Holi, thousands of devotees and tourists visit these towns to celebrate the festival. The festivities usually last for more than a week and ends on Rang Panchami.

Origins 
Associated with legend that is linked to the divine couple Radha Krishna, the festival seeks to recreate it. According to the legend, Lord Krishna who was resident of Nandgaon and considered as the son-in-law of Vrishabhanu wanted to spray the colors on his beloved Radha and her friends. But, as Krishna and his friends entered Barsana, they were playfully greeted with the sticks by Radha and her friends who drove them out of Barsana. Following the same trend, every year on the occasion of Holi, the men of Nandagaon who are treated as son-in-laws of Barsana visit Barsana and are greeted by women with colors and sticks (aka lathi). The celebration is enacted in perfect good humor by both the sides, men of Nandgaon and women of Barsana.

Gallery

See also
Holi
Radha Krishna
Barsana
Nandgaon
Radha Rani Temple

References

External links
 Lord Krishna's land rocks to beats of Holi
 Lathmar Holi celebrations begin in Barsana

Religious festivals in India
Festivals in Uttar Pradesh
Tourist attractions in Mathura district
Holi
Mathura district
Spring traditions
Spring festivals